This is a list of programming which has been or will be carried on the American broadcast programming service MyNetworkTV.

Current programming

Acquired programming

Dramas
Law & Order: Special Victims Unit (2011–18; 2019–present)
Chicago P.D. (2018–present)
Chicago Fire (2021–present)

Reality/non-scripted
Dateline (2017–present)

Former programming

Original programming

Dramas
Desire (2006)
Fashion House (2006)
Watch Over Me (2006–07)
Wicked Wicked Games (2006–07)
American Heiress (2007)
Saints & Sinners (2007)

Comedies
Under One Roof (2008–09)

Reality/non-scripted
Celebrity Exposé (2007–09)
Control Room Presents (2007–08)
Decision House (2007–08)
IFL Battleground (2007–08)
Paradise Hotel (2008)
Street Patrol (2008–09)
The Tony Rock Project (2008–09)
WWE SmackDown (2008–10)
Masters of Illusion (2009)

Acquired programming

Dramas
The Twilight Zone (2008–09)
Law & Order: Criminal Intent (2009-21)
The Unit (2009–10)
Burn Notice (2010–12)
Without a Trace (2010–12)
Monk (2010–14)
Cold Case (2011–12)
House (2012–14)
Numb3rs (2012–13)
White Collar (2012–13)
Bones (2013–17)
The Mentalist (2014–16)
The Walking Dead (2014–16)
The Closer (2015–16)
Agents of S.H.I.E.L.D. (2016–17)
The X-Files (2016–18)
CSI: Miami (2018–20)
The Good Wife (2018–19)

Reality/non-scripted
The Academy (2007)
America's Funniest Home Videos (some affiliates + O&Os) (2009-13)
American Ninja Warrior (2016–18)
Are You Smarter than a 5th Grader? (2009–11)
Breaking the Magician's Code (2007–09)
Comics Unleashed (2008–09)
Deal or No Deal (2009–10)
Don't Forget the Lyrics! (2010–11)
The Best of In Living Color (2007–08)
Jail (2007–09)
Meet My Folks (2007–08)
NFL Total Access (2007–08)
Whacked Out Videos (2008–09)
World's Funniest Moments (2008–09)
Vice Squad (2009)

External links
MyNetworkTV.com - Official Website

MyNetworkTV